Dawid Fedeńczak (born 6 March 1998) is a Polish handball player for Pogoń Szczecin and the Polish national team.

References

1998 births
Living people
People from Nowogard
Sportspeople from West Pomeranian Voivodeship
Polish male handball players